The 1976 German Grand Prix (formally the XXXVIII Großer Preis von Deutschland)  was a Formula One motor race held at the Nürburgring on 1 August 1976. It was the scene of reigning world champion Niki Lauda's near-fatal accident, and the last Formula One race to be held on the Nordschleife section of the track. The 14-lap race was the tenth round of the 1976 Formula One season and was won by James Hunt.

Race report

The old Nürburgring was considered to be the most challenging and demanding purpose-built circuit in the world. Measuring at 14.2 miles (22.8 km), it was by far the longest circuit on the calendar and because it was built in the Eifel mountains it had over 1,000 feet (300 m) of elevation change.  Although it had been slightly remodeled in 1971, it still retained much of the character that led three-time world champion Jackie Stewart to nickname it "The Green Hell". The circuit's extraordinary size meant that it needed at least five times the number of marshals and medical support as almost any other Grand Prix to properly maintain it, something the German organizers were unable to provide. Additionally, by its very nature it was impossible to upgrade it to the increased safety standards of the 1970s. It was narrow, had very few run-off areas, and numerous sections were nearly inaccessible to fire marshals. It was also very bumpy—indeed, at a number of points, including the Flugplatz and Pflanzgarten, the cars could actually become airborne. The sheer size of the circuit also meant that weather and track conditions around it could vary wildly with some sections dry and others wet, making a safe choice of tyres difficult or impossible. Two weeks previously, a fatal crash at Flugplatz had occurred during practice for a Formula Super-Vee race which, according to Autosport, was the 131st fatality at the Nürburgring over its 49-year history. It was also unsuitable for television; its sheer size made it all but impossible to adequately cover a race there. For these reasons, it had been decided even before the 1976 race that after nearly half a century, it would be the last German Grand Prix held on the old Nürburgring and the last on the Nordschleife section.

Defending world champion Niki Lauda, who was also the current season's points leader, was not impressed with safety conditions and the organizers’ inability to provide enough safety support staff (doctors, helicopters, fire marshals) for the leviathan German circuit, especially since the forecast called for rain. He attempted to arrange a boycott of the race, but the other drivers voted against it by just one vote, and the race went ahead.

The race weekend began with some changes to the drivers' lineup: Jacky Ickx was fired from the Walter Wolf Racing team and was replaced by Arturo Merzario, and a new team was present, Scuderia Rondini, which bought an old Tyrrell 007 for Alessandro Pesenti-Rossi. RAM was going to run Rolf Stommelen in one of its ex-works Brabham BT44s, but in the middle of the practice session the local police impounded the cars (because of a legal action by former driver Loris Kessel) and, as a result, Stommelen transferred to the works Brabham team to drive a spare Alfa-Romeo-powered BT45. Lella Lombardi was also affected by the impound action as part of the RAM squad, but could not find a replacement drive.

In 1975, Lauda had been the first and only driver to break the seven-minute mark. Fans were looking forward to whether he or others could repeat this after the technical rules had been changed, with the disappearance of the high air boxes being the most visible difference.

Due to wet conditions on Saturday, the grid was already determined in Friday qualifying, with 7:06-plus lap times similar to those of 1972. James Hunt took the pole with Niki Lauda second, while Patrick Depailler lined up third in the six-wheeled Tyrrell P34. Hans-Joachim Stuck was fourth in his March ahead of Clay Regazzoni, Jacques Laffite, Carlos Pace, Jody Scheckter, Jochen Mass, and Carlos Reutemann.

Race
The 14-lap race was due to start at 1:30pm. but a 15-minute delay was announced as there were numerous Renault 5 saloons to sweep up after they had had a race. The race was delayed till 2:05pm as the weather turned to wet on the far side of the circuit. Most drivers started the race on wet tyres, except Jochen Mass, who, having much experience at the Nürburgring and expecting a change for better weather, decided to use dry weather tyres. At the start, Regazzoni took the lead while both Hunt and Lauda fell back. Hunt took second, third was a fast-starting Mass, fourth was Laffite who took advantage from the fact that Stuck's car had been pushed off the grid with a clutch problem (although the German started at the back of the field). In the course of the first lap, Regazzoni spun and dropped to fourth. At the end of the lap, the weather changed back to dry and most drivers pitted for dry tyres, leaving Mass with the second place behind Peterson, who decided to go on wet tyres for another lap. At the end of lap two, Mass was in front, with Gunnar Nilsson (who had not stopped) in second place and Hunt third.

Lauda had also changed his tyres after lap one and was trying hard to make up for the lost time. Just after the fast left kink before the Bergwerk right hand curve, his Ferrari 312T2 snapped to the right and spun through the fencing into an earth bank. The car bounced back onto the track, enveloped in flames. Guy Edwards managed to avoid the Ferrari, but Brett Lunger hit it and Harald Ertl then hit Lunger's car. All three drivers stopped and tried to get Lauda out of the flames and they were joined by Merzario, who stopped his Wolf Williams after seeing the wreck. Lauda had suffered serious burns and was rushed by helicopter to the Bundeswehr hospital in Koblenz; from there he was flown to the Trauma Clinic in Ludwigshafen, home to Germany's most advanced burn ward at the time, where he fought for his life for the next few days.

Most cars had assembled at the crash site, being unable to pass by on the narrow track. The race had been stopped after the accident, and the race was restarted at 3:10pm, the restart only saw 20 of the 24 starters remained, although Chris Amon decided not to start the race again. The rain had gone and Hunt passed Regazzoni, Scheckter, Depailler, and Pace to take the lead for good. At the Flugplatz, Peterson lost control of his March and crashed heavily, while Regazzoni had another spin and Depailler went off, avoiding the Ferrari. Pace overtook Scheckter and ended the first lap in second place. On the second lap, Scheckter passed Pace and the Brazilian fell behind Regazzoni on the third lap, during which sixth-placed Vittorio Brambilla crashed at Adenau Bridge because of a brake failure on his March. Mass took advantage of it and overtook Gunnar Nilsson on the fifth lap and Pace on lap 10. On the 12th lap, Regazzoni spun again and Mass moved to third with Pace fourth, Nilsson fifth, and Stommelen sixth.

Lauda's accident proved why the old Nürburgring had become too dangerous and too difficult to manage satisfactorily for Formula One. The organizers just did not have the resources to manage such a long circuit, even though the "ONS-Staffel" was equipped with a Porsche 911 rescue car. The biggest concern the drivers had, was that the one helicopter at the circuit was parked in the pits, which was on one extreme end of the circuit- and it took 5 to 6 minutes for it to get to Lauda’s accident site- as opposed to regulations established some years later where there must be a helicopter and efficient services within a minute of any on-track incident. Had it not been for the efforts of his fellow drivers, Lauda would have likely died before rescue crews arrived. After the new Nürburgring was rebuilt with the Nordschleife being bypassed, Formula One would return to the new 2.8-mile circuit for multiple European Grands Prix beginning in 1984, the German Grand Prix from 1985 and in 2020, the inaugural Eifel Grand Prix. 

Chris Amon decided to end his career immediately after Lauda's accident, but returned for the 1976 Canadian Grand Prix, driving a Williams-Ford for Walter Wolf Racing.

Classification

Qualifying 

Stommelen used a #36 Brabham BT44B in both practice sessions on Friday, but his car was seized by police. He then used a #77 Brabham BT45 in the last practice session on Saturday and the race.

Race

Championship standings after the race

Drivers' Championship standings

Constructors' Championship standings

Note: Only the top five positions are included for both sets of standings. Only the best seven results from the first eight races and the best seven results from the last eight races counted towards the Championship. Numbers without parentheses are Championship points; numbers in parentheses are total points scored. Points do not reflect final results of 1976 British Grand Prix as it was under appeal.

References

German Grand Prix
German Grand Prix
German Grand Prix
Sport in Rhineland-Palatinate